Menthyl nicotinate is an organic compound with the formula C16H23NO2. It is the ester of nicotinic acid (niacin, vitamin B3) and menthol. At room temperature, menthyl nicotinate is a colorless, odorless, viscous liquid.

Being a topical lipophilic niacin derivative, menthyl nicotinate is used in cosmetics and personal care products, personal lubricants and intimate hygiene compositions.

Menthyl nicotinate is rapidly absorbed through the stratum corneum and slowly hydrolyzed by skin esterase into niacin and menthol. Such time-dependent release of niacin and menthol, in an equimolar ratio, prevents the excessive niacin-flush effect that is usually observed with other nicotinates.

Niacin is a precursor to coenzyme nicotinamide adenine dinucleotide (NAD), which is essential to all cellular processes involved in immune response and DNA-repairing of photodamaged skin cells.

Niacin has also been used and tested for the purpose of enhancing detoxification by removing skin lipid-stored xenobiotics.

In vitro testing has evidenced menthyl nicotinate's fast skin absorption kinetics and slow percutaneous delivery of niacin.

Its antioxidant, detox, antipollution and protective efficacy against different kinds of damaging agents (UV radiation, oxidizing agents, urban particulates and cigarette smoke) has also been evaluated. Results indicate that menthyl nicotinate significantly enhances  skin barrier function.

References

Esters